NBB can mean:

The Naked Brothers Band (disambiguation), various subjects
National Bank of Bahrain
National Bank of Belgium, the central bank of Belgium since 1850
National Biodiesel Board, a biodiesel interest organization headquartered in Jefferson City, Missouri
New Basket Brindisi, a professional men's basketball club in Brindisi, Italy
Nomura Babcock & Brown, Japanese investment firm
Normal buffer base, a blood value
The Notorious Boo-Boys, supporters of Bohemian F.C.
Novo Basquete Brasil, the top-level Brazilian men's basketball league
Newburgh–Beacon Bridge
New Bullards Bar Dam and New Bullards Bar Reservoir in Northern California